The cycling competitions at the 1996 Olympic Games in Atlanta consisted of three separate categories: road cycling, track cycling, and mountain biking. The road cycling events took place in downtown Atlanta, track cycling was carried out at the Stone Mountain velodrome in neighboring DeKalb County, and the mountain biking events were held at the Georgia International Horse Park in Conyers.

Road

Track

Men’s

Women’s

Mountain bike

Medal table

Broken records

OR = Olympic record, WR = World record

Sources

References

External links
Official Olympic Report

 
1996 Summer Olympics events
1996
Olympics
Olympics
International cycle races hosted by the United States